Mount Schuyler is the peak rising to 1475 m off the northeast extremity of Detroit Plateau in Graham Land on the Antarctic Peninsula.  Surmounting Russell West Glacier to the north and Victory Glacier to the southeast.  Part of the glacial divide between Bransfield Strait and Prince Gustav Channel.

The peak is named after the American diplomat Eugene Schuyler (1840–1890), who investigated the crushing of the Bulgarian April Uprising of 1876 and co-authored the draft decisions of the subsequent 1876 Constantinople Conference.

Location
German-British mapping in 1996.

Maps
 Trinity Peninsula. Scale 1:250000 topographic map No. 5697. Institut für Angewandte Geodäsie and British Antarctic Survey, 1996.
 Antarctic Digital Database (ADD). Scale 1:250000 topographic map of Antarctica. Scientific Committee on Antarctic Research (SCAR), 1993–2016.

Notes

References
 Bulgarian Antarctic Gazetteer. Antarctic Place-names Commission. (details in Bulgarian, basic data in English)
 Mount Schuyler. SCAR Composite Antarctic Gazetteer

External links
 Mount Schuyler. Adjusted Copernix satellite image

Bulgaria and the Antarctic
Mountains of Trinity Peninsula